General elections were held in Mauritius on 20 November 1995. The result was a landslide victory for the  Labour Party-Mauritian Militant Movement alliance led by Navin Ramgoolam, which won all 60 constituency seats on Mauritius. Along with 1982, it was one of two elections in which a party won every seat. The Militant Socialist Movement (MSM) led by Anerood Jugnauth lost power after 13 years, with Jugnauth resigning two days after the results were announced. Navin Ramgoolam became Prime Minister and appointed Paul Berenger as Deputy Prime Minister.

Electoral system
The voting system involved twenty constituencies on Mauritius, which each elected three members. Two seats were elected by residents of Rodrigues, and up to eight seats were filled by the "best losers", although only four were filled at this election. Voter turnout was 79.9%.

Results
Of the 60 seats won by the Labour–MMM alliance, the Labour Party won 35 and the MMM 25.

References

Elections in Mauritius
General
Mauritius